Norman Conquest (1916–1968) was an Australian soccer player who played as a goalkeeper. He represented Australia eleven times.

Playing career

Club career
Conquest played for a number of teams in New South Wales, including Aberdare, Grace Brothers and North Shore.

International career
Conquest played eleven times for Australia between 1947 and 1950. He toured with the Australian team in South Africa. He was the Australian goalkeeper in a 1951 match between Australia and an English Football Association XI representative side at the Sydney Showground which Australia lost 17–0. He also represented the New South Wales state team.

Later years and death
Conquest died at the age of 51 in 1968.

Honours
In 2002 Conquest was posthumously inducted into the Football Federation Australia Hall of Fame.

References

1916 births
Australian soccer players
Association football goalkeepers
Australia international soccer players
1968 deaths